Minas cheese ( or , , literally "cheese from Minas") is a type of cheese that has been traditionally produced in the Brazilian state of Minas Gerais.

A fourth variety, branded  ("standard" cheese) has been developed more recently and can be found in nearly all supermarkets and grocery stores in Brazil.

Minas cheese is made from cow's milk according to traditional recipes. It used to be matured naturally in open air or, much less often, over a cooker to dry with the heat.

 cheese (as the name implies) is served quite fresh, about 4–10 days after preparation, still white and tender. Good  must be juicy, soft, and slightly granulated (instead of rubbery), with a mild taste. The saltiness of its taste might vary widely across producer.

It is not good for cooking, except with beef or pork (the juice helps change its taste), or, as an ingredient to a wider recipe, grilled with sauces such as soy sauce until rubbery. It can be used to make sandwiches, pastries, and crêpes, but it gets slightly rubbery instead of stringy with heat. It pairs well with turkey breast and other low fat cold cuts, cooked onions, tomato, as well as salad rockets, cooked spinach and other strong-tasting vegetables.

 cheese is ready for consumption when the juice has evaporated and the cheese has solidified and acquired a yellowish tint. It is excellent for cooking, being used for a huge variety of dishes of all types, including  and the famous  (cheese bun).

 cheese is often served with goiabada, a sweet product made out of guavas similar to quince cheese.

See also
Brazilian cuisine
Requeijão
Coffee production in Brazil
List of Brazilian dishes
 List of cheeses
Cachaça

References

Brazilian cheeses
Cow's-milk cheeses
Culture in Minas Gerais